Scopula chrysoparalias is a moth of the family Geometridae. It was described by Prout in 1917. It is endemic to Ghana.

References

Endemic fauna of Ghana
Moths described in 1917
chrysoparalias
Insects of West Africa
Moths of Africa
Taxa named by Louis Beethoven Prout